Painted Angels (1997) (US: The Wicked Wicked West) is a film by Jon Sanders starring Brenda Fricker, Kelly McGillis, Meret Becker, Bronagh Gallagher, Lisa Jakub and Anna Mottram.

The film was shot in Saskatchewan, Canada, and follows the lives of several women in a brothel in a midwestern prairie town in the 1870s. It premièred at the International Film Festival Rotterdam and was released in cinemas in the UK by Artificial Eye in February 1999 and on video in June 1999.

References

External links

1997 films
1997 drama films
Canadian drama films
English-language Canadian films
British drama films
1998 drama films
1998 films
1990s English-language films
1990s Canadian films
1990s British films